Stonegate is a street in the city centre of York, in England, one of the streets most visited by tourists. Most of the buildings along the street are listed, meaning they are of national importance due to their architecture or history.

History
The street roughly follows the line of the via praetoria of Eboracum, the Roman city, which ran between what are now St Helen's Square and York Minster.

The street appears to have lost importance in the Anglian and Jorvik period.  York Minster was rebuilt in the 11th century, and stone for it was brought up the road, from a quay behind what is now York Guildhall.  This appears to have brought the street back to prominence, and new building plots were laid adjoining the north-eastern part of the street.  This part of the street lay in the Liberty of St Peter's, associated with the Minster, and many of its buildings belonged to the church, the whole area soon becoming built up, mostly with tenements.  By 1215, there were houses for the prebends of Ampleforth, Barnby, Bramham and North Newbald.

The street was known as "Stonegate" by 1119, probably named for stone paving, which would have been unique in the city at the time, although an alternative theory links the name to the stone hauled up to the Minster.  Glass painters and goldsmiths became prominent along the road, while from the 1500s, it became known for printers and bookshops.  In 1762, John Todd set up a well-known library and bookshop on the street.

Because of the location of the street, it has historically been used for civic processions, from the York Guildhall to the Minster.  It was also the site where three of the historic York Mystery Plays were performed.  In 1570, Guy Fawkes was born at a house on the street.

Nikolaus Pevsner described the street as "perhaps the most attractive [street in the city], and one of the busiest.  Narrow, quite long, and with a variety of good things".  Due to its popularity with tourists, the street was pedestrianised in 1974.  It was repaved in York stone in 2020.

Architecture and layout

The street runs north-east from St Helen's Square to the junction of High and Low Petergate, beyond which its continuation is Minster Gates.  Before 1745, it started slightly further south-west, at a junction with Coney Street and Davygate, so St Helen's, Stonegate was actually accessed from the street.  Various yards lead off its north-western side, while Little Stonegate and the snickleway Coffee Yard lead off its south-eastern side.

Most of the buildings along the street are listed.  Among the most notable on the north-west side are numbers 54, 56, and 58 Stonegate, 14th-century timber-framed buildings; the 12th-century Norman House, in a courtyard off the road; 48 to 52, and 44 to 46, each with 15th-century origins; Ye Olde Starre Inne, in a courtyard, the oldest continuously operating pub in the city, with a sign which has spanned the road since 1733; and numbers 12 to 14, in part dating from the 14th-century.  On the south-east side lie The Punch Bowl, a pub which opened as a coffee house in 1675 and was rebuilt in 1931; and the 15th-century buildings of 13 Stonegate, Mulberry Hall, 21 and 25, 35 and 43 Stonegate.  There are also the headquarters of the York Medical Society, accessed by an alleyway; early 17th-century buildings at 31 and 33 Stonegate; and 37 Stonegate with an early-19th century shopfront.

References

Streets in York
Stonegate (York)